Ape Academy 2 (also known as Piposaru Academia 2: Aiai Sarugee Janken Battle! in Japan) is the sequel to the PlayStation Portable party game Ape Escape Academy.

Similar to its predecessor, Ape Academy 2 is a collection of mini-games which can either be played in single player or multiplayer mode. Most of the mini-games borrow from elements of Ape Escape 3.

The original PlayStation Portable version of the game was released in Japan, Europe and Australia, but not North America. It was later re-released worldwide as a PSP classic for PlayStation 4 and PlayStation 5 on March 21, 2023, marking the first time the game comes out in North American territories.

Plot
The primary antagonist, Specter, introduces a new card game which becomes very popular among humans and pipo monkeys alike. Using this card game, he dominates the world through culture manipulation, concurrently introducing a card battle contest for monkeys to complete in. The prize for winning the contest is the rare "Platinum Specter" trading card and a year's supply of bananas.

Gameplay
The singleplayer mode is radically different from previous games in the series, most resembling a trading card game. The player travels to various levels, in the form of islands, to compete against other monkeys in an assortment of minigames. After a set number of victories, the player can then compete against a boss character. This cycle is repeated for each island visited, in increasing difficulty. Occasionally, the player will encounter unexpected battles. These challenges cannot be declined.  The objective of the game is to collect cards and coins, eventually to the point that the player can attempt to defeat the antagonist and win.  There is also a multiplayer component which includes a "monkey-shield" that ensures the second player cannot see the player 1 cards. This mode requires a second PSP and game cartridge.

Reception
Ape Academy 2 received mixed reviews. It currently holds a 66 out of 100 on Metacritic. Game Master UK described it as "a real mixed bag, but if you really like monkeys and minigames, you might enjoy it".

References

2005 video games
Ape Escape games
Party video games
PlayStation Portable games
PlayStation Portable-only games
Video game sequels
Multiplayer and single-player video games
Video games developed in Japan